Metro United Way is a non-profit organization based in Louisville, Kentucky and is part of the United Way Worldwide system of 1,800 community-based offices located across 45 countries and territories.  Founded in 1917, Metro United Way provides community service (Louisville metro and Southern Indiana) by engaging people to give, advocate and volunteer. This is accomplished through partnerships with schools, government organizations, corporations, organized labor, banks, community organizations, and neighborhood associations.

On July 12, 2021, Adria Johnson was selected as the organization's President and CEO.

See also
 United Way of America

External links
 Official site

References
 Is Metro United Way becoming the 'Untied Way'?
Louisville nonprofits court millennials
United Way cuts funding for 15 programs

Organizations established in 1917
Charities based in Kentucky
United Ways
Non-profit organizations based in Louisville, Kentucky
International volunteer organizations
1917 establishments in Kentucky